Richmond Ageymang-Rak (born 10 March 1985 in Accra, Ghana) is a Ghanaian-Swiss footballer, who currently plays as midfielder for FC Le Mont in the Swiss Challenge League. He holds both a Ghanaian passport and a Swiss passport.

Career 
Rak signed a -year contract with Neuchâtel Xamax in January 2007. In August 2011, he signed with Swiss side FC Le Mont for the 2011–2012 Swiss Challenge League season after his contract with Neuchâtel Xamax had expired and was not renewed.

External links
Profile at Ghanaweb
Profile at Sport.de

1985 births
Living people
Ghanaian footballers
Swiss men's footballers
FC Lausanne-Sport players
Grasshopper Club Zürich players
Neuchâtel Xamax FCS players
Swiss Super League players
Ghanaian emigrants to Switzerland
Ghanaian expatriate sportspeople in Switzerland
Association football midfielders
Swiss people of Ghanaian descent